Adam Clay (born December 31, 1982, in Dallas, Pennsylvania) is a retired professional soccer player for American USL Second Division side Harrisburg City Islanders.

Biography
Clay attended Bloomsburg University where he played on the men's soccer team for four years.  Following graduation in 2004, he began his professional career with the Reading Rage of the Premier Development League. In 2005, he moved up to the Harrisburg City Islanders in the USL Second Division and played for the franchise for four seasons, making a total of 67 league appearances and scoring six goals. Adam then worked as a Real Estate agent primarily in the City of Harrisburg after his retirement from soccer.

References
Adam Clay profile at the Harrisburg City Islanders official website

1982 births
Living people
American soccer players
Bloomsburg University of Pennsylvania alumni
Penn FC players
USL Second Division players
Reading United A.C. players
USL League Two players
Association football midfielders